The Fontaine du Roi René is a listed fountain in Aix-en-Provence, Bouches-du-Rhône, France.

Location
It is located at the top of the Cours Mirabeau in the centre of Aix-en-Provence.

History
The fountain was designed by French architect Pierre-Henri Révoil (1776-1842) in 1819.

On top of the fountain, the statue was designed by French sculptor David d'Angers (1788–1856) in 1822, in honor of René of Anjou. It shows him holding muscat grapes, which he brought to Provence.

It was restored in 2009, to mark the 600th birthday of Roi René.

Heritage significance
It is listed as a "monument historique".

References

Buildings and structures in Aix-en-Provence
Buildings and structures completed in 1822
Monuments historiques of Aix-en-Provence
Fountains in France
1822 establishments in France
19th-century architecture in France